Pioneer Street is the continuation of Boni Avenue east of Epifanio de los Santos Avenue (EDSA) in eastern Metro Manila, Philippines. The street has four lanes for most of its course beginning at the EDSA junction in Barangka Ilaya, Mandaluyong, where traffic emerges from the Boni Avenue tunnel, up to its easternmost point at the Shaw Boulevard junction at the boundary of barangays Kapitolyo and San Antonio in Pasig, adjacent to Ortigas Center. En route, it passes through the Robinsons Cybergate Complex where Forum Robinsons mall is located; the United Laboratories plant; and Greenfield District, a mixed-use development south of Ortigas Center by the junction with Shaw Boulevard. Pioneer Street is also the location of several new condominium developments, call center sites and a few strip malls. It is served by Boni Station of the MRT-3 at EDSA.

See also
 Boni Avenue

References

Streets in Metro Manila